Aethes perfidana is a species of moth of the family Tortricidae. It was described by Kennel in  1901. It is endemic to Spain.

Adults are on wing in June.

The larvae feed on Santolina species.

References

perfidana
Moths described in 1901
Taxa named by Julius von Kennel
Moths of Europe